Thomas Dolan was an American engineer who proposed the first fully developed concept of Lunar orbit rendezvous for the Apollo program while working at Vought Astronautics.

Dolan referred to his LOR study concept as Manned Lunar Landing and Return (MALLAR), and it was largely ignored by NASA administrators until Langley engineer John Houbolt began championing the concept in 1961.
The proposed idea outlined a smaller spacecraft dedicated only to operate in the vacuum of space. This spacecraft could act as sort of a shuttle between an orbiting "command module" in Lunar orbit and the surface of the Moon. Following this mission profile required the Command/Service Module and Lunar Module to fly all the way to the moon together and undock while in orbit around the moon, at which point the Lunar Module would land on the moon. In order to return, it would lift off again into lunar orbit and perform an orbital rendezvous with the Command/Service Module. The lander's ascent stage would be left behind in orbit, and the crew would return home using the Command/Service Module.
This method saved a lot of weight in propellant and spacecraft mass, but did not gain widespread acceptance early on. The risks associated with Lunar orbit rendezvous were initially considered unacceptable by NASA officials.
The Gemini missions would later prove that rendezvous and docking was indeed possible in space, paving the way for Dolan's idea to be put into practice.

In the fifth episode of the 1998 HBO mini-series From the Earth to the Moon entitled "Spider", Tom Dolan is portrayed by Alan Ruck.

See also 
 Conrad Lau

References

External links
NASA history: Enchanted Rendezvous (PDF).
NASA history: another version of Enchanted Rendezvous, as chapter 8 of "SP-4308 SPACEFLIGHT REVOLUTION".

American aerospace engineers
Possibly living people
Year of birth missing